Looney Tunes B-Ball (also known as Looney Tunes Basketball in some regions) is a basketball video game. It was released for the Super Nintendo Entertainment System in 1995 and developed by Sculptured Software.

Gameplay 

Looney Tunes B-Ball is an arcade-style basketball game starring the Looney Tunes. It is similar to other arcade-style basketball games of the 16-bit era, such as NBA Jam.

The game features 2-on-2 gameplay. Up to four human players can play simultaneously with the SNES Multitap. Players can collect gems on the court to purchase in-game power-ups, such as a protective forcefield or a cream pie to throw at opponents. Another power-up which can be purchased is a character-unique signature long-range shot (for a 3-point field goal). These shots can only be used by a character on his defensive side of the court and if his team has the funds to do so, but the shot always travels in the direction of the goal his team is attacking. The game ball will, at random, turn into a dog which will run around the court and automatically does this when a shot-clock violation occurs.

The game also includes in-game cheat codes, which can be used during gameplay, and are activated by inputting specific sequential button presses.

Characters
 Bugs Bunny (voiced by Greg Burson)
 Daffy Duck (voiced by Greg Burson)
 Elmer Fudd (voiced by Greg Burson)
 Wile E. Coyote
 Tasmanian Devil (voiced by Greg Burson)
 Yosemite Sam
 Sylvester the Cat (voiced by Greg Burson)
 Marvin the Martian (voiced by Greg Burson)

Reception 

GamePro declared the game "great fun for any Looney Tunes or basketball fan", praising the humorous special moves, easy-to-handle controls, and fluid graphics. A reviewer for Next Generation likened the game to a Looney Tunes version of NBA Jam, and concluded it to be "fun for all ages and easy enough for younger players to play." He gave it three out of five stars.

References

External links 
 Looney Tunes B-Ball at GameFAQs
 Looney Tunes B-Ball at Giant Bomb
 Looney Tunes B-Ball at MobyGames

1995 video games
Basketball video games
Multiplayer and single-player video games
Sunsoft games
Super Nintendo Entertainment System games
Super Nintendo Entertainment System-only games
Video games based on Looney Tunes
Video games developed in the United States
Cartoon Network video games